Philly is a common informal name for Philadelphia, the largest city in Pennsylvania, United States.

Philly  may also refer to:

People
Phillip Philly Brown (born 1991), American football player
Philly Bryne, a member of the Northern Ireland thrash metal band Gama Bomb
Philomena Philly Fogarty, Irish camogie player in the 1990s and 2000s
Philip Philly Larkin (born 1974), Irish hurler
Philly Lutaaya (1951–1989), Ugandan musician
Philly Joe Jones (1923–1985), American jazz drummer nicknamed "Philly Joe"

Arts and entertainment
"Philly" (song), a song by the English electronic music band Fluke
half of the Pete Philly and Perquisite Dutch hip hop duo
Philly (TV series), an American television series that aired from 2001 to 2002
Philly Cullen, a character in the play The Playboy of the Western World

Other uses
Philly (dog), a dog that served in World War I

See also

Filly, a young female horse
Phillie Phanatic, the mascot of the Philadelphia Phillies
Philly Cheese Steak, a type of sandwich originating from Philadelphia
Phillies (disambiguation)
Philadelphia (disambiguation)
Philadelphian (disambiguation)

Hypocorisms